Numenes takamukui is a moth of the family Erebidae first described by Shōnen Matsumura in 1927. It is found in Taiwan.

References

Moths described in 1927
Lymantriinae
Taxa named by Shōnen Matsumura